Enes Özdemir (born 2002) is a Turkish karateka competing in the kata.

He won the gold medal in the Team kata  event at the 2021 European Karate Championships held in Poreč, Croatia.

He won the bronze medal in the Team kata  event at the 2021 World Karate Championships held in Dubai,  United Arab Emirates.

References

2002 births
Living people
Turkish male karateka
21st-century Turkish people